Worldview is an American Christian metal band, while they make heavy metal, power metal, and progressive metal music, and they started making music together in 2013. They have released one studio album, The Chosen Few (2015), with M24 Music Group.

Background
The band originated in Los Angeles, California, in January 2013, after the death of a mutual friend, Rick Macias, who was the keyboardist for Sacred Warrior. Worldviews lead vocalist, Rey Parra, also a member of Sacred Warrior with Marcias, and George Rene Ochoa, a guitarist, keyboardist, and background vocalist for Worldview, also played in bands such as Vengeance Rising, Deliverance, Mortification, and Recon. Other members of Worldview consisted of bassist and keyboardist, Todd Libby and drummer, Johnny Gonzales. Ronson Webster, a singer-songwriter and former keyboardist for Recon and Barren Cross, took on the role as lead vocalist for the band in 2019. Webster has co-wrote several songs with Ochoa such as "Alive", "Lost Soldier", "Take Us Away", "Mortality", "The Mirror", "Prisoner of Pain", "Back in Time", "Illusions of Love" and "The Chosen Few". Webster also sang background vocals on albums; Recon - Behind Enemy Lines and Worldview - The Chosen Few.

Music history
The band released, The Chosen Few, a studio album, on May 26, 2015, with M24 Music Group.

Members
Current
 Mike Lee - vocals (2019–present)
 George Rene Ochoa – guitar, keys, background vocals (2013–present)
 Todd Libby – bass guitar, keys (2013–present)
 Terry Russel - drums background vocals (2018–present)

Former
 Rey Parra – lead vocals (2013-2018)
 Ronson Webster - lead vocals, keyboards (2018-2019)
 Ray Vidal - guitars, backing vocals (2013-2014)
 Johnny Gonzales - drums & percussion (2013-2017)
 Glen Mancaruso - drums (2017-2018)
 Alessandro Bertoni - keyboards (2019)

Timeline

Discography
 The Chosen Few (May 26, 2015, M24)

References

External links

American Christian metal musical groups
American power metal musical groups
American progressive metal musical groups
Heavy metal musical groups from California
Musical quartets
Musical groups established in 2013
2013 establishments in California